is a railway station in Takaki Town, Isahaya, Nagasaki Prefecture, Japan. It is operated by JR Kyushu and is on the Nagasaki Main Line.

Oe Station has one of the shortest station names in Japan. The others are Ei Station in Kagoshima Prefecture, Ao Station in Hyōgo Prefecture and Ii Station in Yamaguchi Prefecture. Tsu Station of Mie Prefecture has a shorter name in Japanese (it is the only station name written with one kana), but this is not so when romanized.

Lines

Station layout 
The station consists of an island platform two tracks. The station building is a metal cabin and is unstaffed, serving only as a waiting room with an automatic ticket vending machine. Access to the island platform is by means of a footbridge.

Adjacent stations

History
Japanese Government Railways (JGR) built the station in the 1930s during the development of an alternative route for the Nagasaki Main Line along the coast of the Ariake Sea. Oe was opened on the same day as an intermediate station on this stretch of track. With through traffic achieved from Hizen-Yamaguchi on the new route to Nagasaki, the entire stretch of track was designated as part of the Nagasaki Main Line on 1 December 1934. With the privatization of Japanese National Railways (JNR), the successor of JGR, on 1 April 1987, control of the station passed to JR Kyushu.

Passenger statistics
In fiscal 2014, there were a total of 52,823 boarding passengers, given a daily average of 145 passengers.

Station environs
To the south of the station is the Ariake Sea. Route 207 runs along the coast. Other locations nearby include:
Takaki Nishi Elementary School
Isahaya Senior High School, Takaki Branch
Shinkai Post Office

See also
 List of railway stations in Japan

References

External links

Oe Station (JR Kyushu)

Nagasaki Main Line
Railway stations in Nagasaki Prefecture
Railway stations in Japan opened in 1934